Liza Anne (born Elizabeth Anne Odachowski) is an American  rock musician born in Saint Simons Island, Georgia, living in Nashville TN.

Career
Liza Anne began her career in 2010. In 2014, she released her debut full-length album titled The Colder Months. In May 2015, Liza Anne released her second full-length album titled Two. Liza Anne's third studio album, Fine but Dying, was released on March 9, 2018. Liza Anne's fourth full-length album, Bad Vacation, was released in 2020.

Discography
Studio albums
The Colder Months (2014)
Two (2015)
Fine but Dying (2018)
Bad Vacation (2020)

References

External links

 Official website

Musicians from Atlanta
American folk musicians
Year of birth missing (living people)
Living people